The medial pterygoid muscle (or internal pterygoid muscle), is a thick, quadrilateral muscle of the face. It is supplied by the mandibular branch of the trigeminal nerve (V). It is important in mastication (chewing).

Structure 
The medial pterygoid muscle consists of two heads. The bulk of the muscle arises as a deep head from just above the medial surface of the lateral pterygoid plate. The smaller, superficial head originates from the maxillary tuberosity and the pyramidal process of the palatine bone.

Its fibers pass downward, lateral, and posterior, and are inserted, by a strong tendinous lamina, into the lower and back part of the medial surface of the ramus and angle of the mandible, as high as the mandibular foramen. The insertion joins the masseter muscle to form a common tendinous sling which allows the medial pterygoid and masseter to be powerful elevators of the jaw.

Nerve supply 
The medial pterygoid muscle is supplied by the medial pterygoid nerve, a branch of the mandibular nerve, itself a branch of the trigeminal nerve (V). This also supplies the tensor tympani muscle and the tensor veli palatini muscle. The medial pterygoid nerve is a main trunk from the mandibular nerve, before the division of the trigeminal nerve - this is unlike the lateral pterygoid muscle, and all other muscles of mastication which are supplied by the anterior division of the mandibular nerve.

Function 
The medial pterygoid muscle has functions including elevating the mandible (closing the mouth), protruding the mandible, mastication (especially for when the maxillary teeth and the mandibular teeth are close together), and excursing the mandible (contralateral excursion occurs with unilateral contraction).

Additional images

References

External links 

 
 

Muscles of the head and neck